Ignatius Ang Yu Heng (born 11 November 1992) is a Singaporean footballer who plays as a midfielder for Balestier Khalsa in the S.League.

Youth career 
Before Ang started playing in the S.League, he played for the National Youth Academy, having represented the Under-16 and the Under-18 sides. Ang also played for the H-TWO-O/ITE Dream Team.

Career

Arsenal Youth Academy

Young Lions
He started his career with the Young Lions in 2010 and stayed there for 2 years before leaving the club. He rejoined the club in 2013.

Hougang United
He made his way to Hougang after being released in 2011 by the Young Lions.

LionsXII
He was drafted by Fandi to the LionsXII team in 2014. However, Ang failed to stake a claim in the team despite being named regularly on the bench.

Balestier Khalsa
After he was released by the FAS, he moved to Balestier and enjoyed more playing time after earning the trust of coach Mirko Kraljevic. His performances for the Tigers saw him earn a Young Player of the Year nomination.

Warriors FC
Following good performances with the Tigers, he choose to move to the Warriors FC. However, this proved to be a wrong move as Ang failed to get regular game time.

SAFSA
Ang played for SAFSA, due to National Service.

Warriors FC 
Ang will make a return to the professional S.League with former club, Warriors FC, in May 2018.

International career 
Although he was just a backup player in the LionsXII squad, Ang was called up to the Singapore Under-21 team for the Hassanal Bolkiah Trophy, one of the much-respected Southeast Asian youth tournaments.

References

External links 
 

Living people
1992 births
Singaporean footballers
Singaporean sportspeople of Chinese descent
Association football midfielders
Hougang United FC players
LionsXII players
Singapore Premier League players
Young Lions FC players